Alexander Kirkpatrick  (4 October 1898 – 25 August 1971) was an All Blacks rugby union player from New Zealand.  He was a hooker.
He played 12 matches for the All Blacks in1925-26 against Australia (New South Wales), scoring 6 points (2 tries).

He was a member of the Hastings club and captained the Hawke’s Bay Region to take the Ranfurly Shield off Wellington in 1922; and appeared in 22 of the 24 successful defences (more than any other player). In 1952-56 he served on the NZRFU Council (1956 as president), and was on the Appeal Council 1957–1971.

He was born in Northern Ireland and died in Hastings, New Zealand. He came to New Zealand young, and was educated at Woodville District High School.

He was deputy mayor of Hastings for 18 years, and was chairman of the Hawke’s Bay Harbour Board. He was Chancellor of the New Zealand Red Cross 1967–71. He was made officer of the Order of the British Empire and was a Knight of the Order of St John.

References

Bibliography
 Palenski, R., Chester, R., and McMillan, N., (2005). The Encyclopaedia of New Zealand Rugby (4th ed.).  Auckland: Hodder Moa Beckett. 

1898 births
1971 deaths
New Zealand rugby union players
New Zealand international rugby union players
Rugby union hookers
Rugby union players from Hastings, New Zealand
Deputy mayors of places in New Zealand
New Zealand Rugby Football Union officials
Local politicians in New Zealand